Canavirgella is a genus of fungi within the Rhytismataceae family. This is a monotypic genus, containing the single species Canavirgella banfieldii.

References

External links
Index Fungorum

Monotypic Leotiomycetes genera